Paul O'Sullivan may refer to:
Paul O'Sullivan (diplomat), Australian political adviser and diplomat
Paul O'Sullivan (actor) (1964–2012), Canadian actor and comedian
Paul O'Sullivan (horseman), New Zealand racehorse trainer
The Paul O'Sullivan Band, Internationally-based pop/rock band

See also
Paul Sullivan (disambiguation)